Princess Kalani Ahumanu i Kaliko o Iwi Kauhipua o Kīnau, also known as Elizabeth Kīnau ( – April 4, 1839) was Kuhina Nui of the Kingdom of Hawaii as Kaahumanu II, queen regent and dowager queen.

Life
Her father was King Kamehameha I and her mother was Kalākua Kaheiheimālie. She was born probably in 1805 on the island of Oahu at Waikiki.  She was given in hānai to her stepmother Peleuli and her second husband Kawelookalani, her father's half-brother. Peleuli named her Kīnau after her son Kahōanokū Kīnau (her half-brother) and took her back to the island of Hawaii after Kamehameha moved his capital back to Kailua-Kona.

Kīnau was first married to her half-brother Liholiho (1797–1824) who ascended in 1819 as King Kamehameha II. In 1824, at around 19 years of age, she became Dowager Queen when Kamehameha II died in London with his favorite wife (her sister) Queen Kamāmalu.

Her second husband was Kahalaia Luanuu, a grandson of Kamehameha I. She had a son who perished along with his father in the whooping cough epidemic of 1826.
Her third husband was Mataio Kekūanāoʻa (1791–1868), from 1827. Queen Kaahumanu was furious over their union because of his inferior rank and her wish that she married Kamehameha III in accordance with their father's wish that his children by Keōpūolani would continue his line with his children by Kaheiheimālie.
Kekūanāoa was governor of Oahu (1834–1868).
To him she bore four sons: David Kamehameha (1828–1835), Moses Kekūāiwa (1829–1848), Lot Kapuāiwa (1830–1873), and Alexander Liholiho (1830–1873), and one daughter Victoria Kamāmalu (1838–1866).

She became the Kuhina Nui (an office somewhat like prime minister or co-regent) styled as Kaahumanu II June 5, 1832, when Queen Kaahumanu died. She acted as the regent for her brother Kauikeaouli when he became King Kamehameha III, from June 5, 1832, to March 15, 1833. She ruled with him until her death. She was responsible for enforcing Hawaii's first penal code, proclaimed by the king in 1835. She adopted Protestant Christianity like many of the chiefs and chiefesses. She persecuted many of the Catholic missionaries and tried to expel the French Jesuit priests, which would later lead into diplomatic troubles with France.

During the early years of Kamehameha III, he was seen to be indifferent to his duties as king and spend his time pursuing leisure instead of ruling, according to the missionaries. She felt she had to take full duty of a monarch, but soon became disheartened and at length came to Laura Fish Judd, the wife of Gerrit P. Judd, and said: "I am in sore straits and heavy hearted, and I have come to tell you my thought. I am quite discouraged and cannot bear this burden any longer. I wish to throw away my rank and title and responsibility together, bring my family here, and live with you; or, we will take our families and go away together." Mrs. Judd referred her to the story of Esther, and pointed out to her that she must be strong and accept the responsibility of Regent of the nation for the sake of her people.

Kīnau and Kamehameha III argued over government policies. Kīnau favored the policies recommended by the missionaries and was not as tolerant of other religions as her predecessor, Kaahumanu. She strengthened the land tenure of the Crown Lands by written and official proclamation. Kamehameha III resented the lessened power of the king who no longer had sole power to give and take land at will. He wanted the old ways for his people. Eventually they resolved their differences and formed a new government. Now there was a King, a Kuhina Nui, and a Counsel of Chiefs.

Her two sons from her third husband who had survived to adulthood ascended as kings of Hawaii: the younger Alexander Liholiho as Kamehameha IV and then Lot Kapuāiwa as Kamehameha V. Her only daughter Victoria Kamāmalu became Kuhina Nui as Kaahumanu IV.

Her widower Mataio Kekūanāoa became Kuhina Nui from 1863 until August 24, 1864, the last holder of that position when it was dissolved by the 1864 Constitution of the Kingdom of Hawaii.

Kaahumanu II died of the mumps at Honolulu, Oahu on April 4, 1839.
Her funeral was held on July 7 at Kawaiahaʻo Church and she was buried in the Pohukaina Mausoleum on the grounds of ʻIolani Palace. British Admiral Edward Belcher attended and described her funeral in detail. Her remains were later transported along with those of other royals in a midnight torchlight procession on October 30, 1865, to the newly constructed Mauna ʻAla Royal Mausoleum up in the Nuʻuanu Valley.

Family tree

References

Bibliography

1805 births
1839 deaths
Converts to Christianity from pagan religions
House of Kamehameha
Hawaiian royal consorts
Royalty of the Hawaiian Kingdom
Infectious disease deaths in Hawaii
Governors of Oahu
Kuhina Nui
Hawaiian adoptees (hānai)
Regents of the Hawaiian Kingdom
Native Hawaiian women in politics
Burials in Hawaii
Remarried royal consorts
Daughters of kings